Saarrah Adu Gyamfi was a Ghanaian politician. He was the member of parliament for the Jaman constituency. Prior to entering parliament, he was the spraying superintendent for the Ministry of Agriculture in Sunyani.

See also
 List of MPs elected in the 1965 Ghanaian parliamentary election

References

Date of birth missing
Date of death missing
Ghanaian MPs 1965–1966
Convention People's Party (Ghana) politicians
20th-century Ghanaian politicians